Thomas Henry Moray (August 28, 1892 - May 18, 1974) was an inventor from Salt Lake City, Utah. He received application for US patent 2,460,707 in February 1949, after a process of 17 years in discussions with the patent office. The title of the patent is "Electrotherapeutic Device", and although radiotherapy is mentioned, no details are given.

During the 1920s, Thomas Henry Moray worked in the emerging field of radio. After hundreds of experiments designed to improve radio reception, Moray claimed to have discovered a source of energy transmission apparently available everywhere. Using advanced ideas in solid state detectors, he developed a power source which he claimed to produce 50,000 watts of a cold form of electricity . By the early 1930s, dozens of people had reportedly witnessed demonstrations of this technology.

In 1944 Moray was paid $25 a day by the rural electrification administration to perfect his system of drawing electrical energy out of the atmosphere. He claimed his invention produced electricity with no exterior input of energy.

The primary component of the device was a non-heated vacuum tube. At the time most vacuum tubes had heaters built inside. The patent office refused to grant his patent, initially, because they claimed that any vacuum tube without a heater would not work. He was never granted a patent for his power supply device. He did have other inventions and was able to obtain a patent application for one of those, the Electrotherapeutic device.

References

1892 births
1974 deaths
Free energy conspiracy theories
People from Salt Lake City
20th-century American inventors